High & Mighty is the seventh studio album by southern rock jam band Gov't Mule. The album was released on August 22, 2006, by ATO Records.

Track listing
All songs written by Warren Haynes.

Personnel
 Warren Haynes – guitar, vocals, production
 Matt Abts – drums, percussion
 Danny Louis – keyboards, guitar, background vocals
 Andy Hess – bass

Additional personnel
 Gordie Johnson – production, mixing, engineering, background vocals, tambourine
 Ruthie Foster, Sonia Moore, Sheree Smith – background vocals

References

Gov't Mule albums
2006 albums
ATO Records albums